Neotermes insularis (common name - Ringant termite) is a species of termite in the genus Neotermes. It is native to Australia. It was first described by Francis Walker in 1853 as Termes insularis.

References

Blattodea
Termites
Insects described in 1853
Invertebrates of Australia